Jason Smith (born April 30, 1986) is a former American football offensive tackle. He was drafted by the St. Louis Rams with the second overall pick in the 2009 NFL Draft. He played college football at Baylor University. As a professional, he was a member of the Rams, the New York Jets and the New Orleans Saints.

High school career
Smith attended W. T. White High School, in Dallas, Texas. He was a First-team All-District honors as a sophomore and junior as an offensive tackle. As a senior, he was moved to tight end, catching seven passes for 101 yards and one touchdown. He was rewarded with All-District honors as a senior.

He drew few scholarship offers and committed to Baylor on the same day that he received his offer.

College career
After redshirting his first season at Baylor, Smith played tight end in 2005, appearing in 11 games, starting eight. He caught 6 passes for 70 yards and one touchdown. As a sophomore in 2006, he was moved to the offensive line and started all 12 games of his sophomore season at right tackle. Despite missing several games due to a sprained knee, Smith earned an All-Big 12 honorable mention as he started seven games at left tackle as a junior.

Prior to his senior year, Smith graduated a year early from the school in May 2008, having graduated with a Bachelor of Science in Education degree in recreation. As a senior in 2008 he was an All-American selection and an All-Big 12 Conference selection as well. Smith was named Baylor's co-Most Valuable Player. He was credited by the school with 96 knockdown blocks, which were the most ever by a Baylor offensive lineman. Smith gave up  sacks and was penalized five times. With Baylor running a spread offense since the arrival of new head coach Art Briles, Smith was usually in a two-point stance for pass protection, which caused NFL scouts to question his run blocking ability.

College awards and honors
2008 First-team All-Big 12
2008 Associated Press and Rivals.com Third-team All-American
2008 Football Writers Association of America All-American
2008 Pro Football Weekly honorable mention All-American

Professional career

2009 NFL Draft
At the 2009 NFL Combine, Smith recorded the 11th-fastest 40-yard dash (5.09 seconds), tied for the fourth-most repetitions in the bench press (33), and was sixth in the three-cone drill (7.53 seconds) among all offensive linemen who participated. He scored a 23 on the Wonderlic Test. Smith drew comparisons to Ryan Clady.

Smith was drafted second overall in the 2009 NFL Draft by the St. Louis Rams. He was Baylor's first first-round draft pick since Daryl Gardener in 1996.

St. Louis Rams
On July 30, 2009, the Rams agreed to terms with Smith on a six-year contract worth up to $61 million, with $33 million in guarantees.

As a rookie in 2009, Smith played mostly right tackle, although he played some left tackle, the position for which he was drafted. In his rookie season Smith, suffered a serious concussion November 22, 2009. "My situation was real serious," Smith related, and it caused him to miss the remainder of his rookie season. In 2010, Smith was beaten out by rookie Rodger Saffold.

New York Jets
The St. Louis Rams agreed to trade Smith to the New York Jets in exchange for tackle Wayne Hunter on August 27, 2012. He was released from the Jets on February 19, 2013.

New Orleans Saints
On April 11, 2013, Smith signed with the New Orleans Saints. On August 21, 2013, he was released by the Saints.

New York Jets (second stint)
On August 23, 2013, Smith was re-signed by the New York Jets. He was released on August 31, 2013.

References

External links
Baylor Bears bio
Baylor's Smith leaves no doubts
December 22, 2008 interview with Scout.com

1986 births
Living people
Players of American football from Dallas
American football tight ends
American football offensive tackles
Baylor Bears football players
St. Louis Rams players
New York Jets players
New Orleans Saints players
W. T. White High School alumni